Abigail Cheramie Duhon (born April 20, 2000) is an American Christian musician and actress. She released a studio album, Right Now, with IShine Records and Infinity Music Group, in 2014. The album saw two of its singles, "La La La" and "Praying for You", place on the Billboard magazine Hot Singles Sales chart. Her subsequent release, an extended play, More Than Gold, was independently released, in 2015.

Early life
Abigail Cheramie Duhon was born on April 20, 2000, in New Orleans, Louisiana, to father, Troy Joseph Duhon, an automobile dealership owner, and mother, Tracy Cheramie Duhon. She has an older brother, Joshua Duhon, and two younger sisters, with her younger brother, Jonathan Joseph Duhon, dying of Potter's Syndrome on the day he was born. Her first song was penned at the age of six, along with starting piano lessons and vocal training at nine years old, while becoming a recording artist at eleven.

Music career
Her music recording career commenced in 2011, however her first studio album, Right Now, was released on March 15, 2014, by IShine Records. She had two singles breakthrough on the Billboard magazine Hot Singles Sales chart, with the first one "La La La", placing at a peak of No. 3, while her second, "Praying for You", charting at a peak of No. 7. The subsequent release, an extended play, More Than Gold, was released independently, on August 14, 2015.

Acting career 

Duhon appeared in God's Not Dead in 2014, God's Not Dead 2 in 2016, and God's Not Dead: A Light in Darkness in 2018. In 2016, Duhon partnered with the directors, producers and actors of Visible Pictures, to write and record a song, "I'm Not Ashamed" for the 2016 film I'm Not Ashamed. In return, Duhon appeared in the film as the character Chloe beside Cameron McKendry and Bella Robertson.

She appeared in the drama-biographical film, The Pastor in December 2018.

Discography
Studio albums
 Right Now (March 15, 2014, IShine)
God's Not Dead: A Light In Darkness (Songs From And Inspired By The Motion Picture) (March 30, 2018, Dream Records, DRE)

EPs
 Abigail Duhon (May 26, 2017, Dream Records)
 More Than Gold (August 14, 2015, Independent)

Filmography

References

External links
 Official website
 Interview with Mother

2000 births
Living people
American performers of Christian music
Musicians from New Orleans
Songwriters from Louisiana
Actresses from New Orleans
21st-century American women musicians